Samuel Smith Jr. is a former Democratic member of the Indiana Senate, representing the 2nd District from 1998 to 2008.

References

External links
Project Vote Smart - Senator Samuel Smith Jr. (IN) profile
Follow the Money - Samuel Smith Jr
2006 2004 2002 2000 1998 campaign contributions

Democratic Party Indiana state senators
Living people
Winona State University alumni
Year of birth missing (living people)